Shahrak-e Yaser (also Romanized as Shahrak-e Yāser) is a village in Abezhdan Rural District, Abezhdan District, Andika County, Khuzestan Province, Iran. At the 2006 census, its population was 404, in 66 families.

References 

Populated places in Andika County